George Edward Doherty (September 5, 1920 – December 31, 1987) was an American football player and coach and college athletics administrator.

Doherty was born in Mississippi in 1920 and attended Canton High School in Canton, Mississippi. He played college football at Louisiana Tech University. During World War II, he served in the military.

Doherty played professional football as a Guard and tackle in the National Football League (NFL) for the Brooklyn Tigers in 1944 and the Boston Yanks in 1945. He then jumped to the All-America Football Conference (AFFC), playing for the Buffalo Bisons and New York Yankees in 1946 and for the Buffalo Bills in 1947. He appeared in 43 professional football games, 29 of them as a starter. 

Doherty served as an assistant football coach at Louisiana Tech (1958–1966) and Northwestern State University (1967–1971). He became the head coach at Northwestern State in 1972 and held that post through the 1974 season, compiling a record of 15–17 in three seasons.

Doherty died of a heart attack in 1987 in Natchitoches, Louisiana.

Head coaching record

References

1920 births
1987 deaths
American football guards
American football tackles
Boston Yanks players
Brooklyn Tigers players
Buffalo Bills (AAFC) players
Louisiana Tech Bulldogs football coaches
Louisiana Tech Bulldogs football players
Northwestern State Demons and Lady Demons athletic directors
Northwestern State Demons football coaches
Players of American football from Mississippi
American military personnel of World War II